Botelloides bassianus is a species of sea snail, a marine gastropod mollusk in the family Trochidae, the top snails.

Subspecies
 Botelloides bassianus bassianus (Hedley, 1911) (synonyms: Rissoa (Onoba) glomerosa Gatliff & Gabriel, 1908; Rissoa (Onoba) bassiana Hedley, 1911)
 Botelloides bassianus borda Cotton, 1944 (synonym: Botelloides borda Cotton, 1944)

Description
The height of the shell attains 4.5 mm, its diameter 2 mm. The solid, oblong shell  has a subcylindrical shape. It is rounded at each extremity.

Colour: the upper part of each whorl is dull white, the lower slate-purple, the anterior extremity is again dull white, the dark band on the median third of the body whorl fading away before reaching the aperture. The apex is brown. The five whorls increase rapidly in size. They are wound obliquely the last two-thirds of the total length.

Sculpture : The earlier whorls are smooth, the later bear fine incised spiral grooves, of which the last has about thirty, the penultimate eighteen, and the antepenultimate twelve. Occasional growth striae cross the shell obliquely. The aperture is pyriform. The columella is excavate. The outer lip is grooved within and bevelled to a sharp edge.

The subspecies Botelloides bassianus borda differs by its cylindrical shell and the sides of the whorls that are rather flattened.

Distribution
This marine species is endemic to Australia and occurs off New South Wales, South Australia, Tasmania, Victoria and Western Australia

References

 B.C. Cotton, Recent Australian Species of the family Rissoidae (Mollusca); Transactions of the Royal Society of South Australia v. 68, 1944
 Ponder, W.F. 1985. A revision of the genus Botelloides (Mollusca: Gastropoda: Trochacea). Department of Mines and Energy, South Australia, Special Publication 5: 301-327
 Hickman, C.S. & McLean, J.H. 1990. Systematic revision and suprageneric classification of trochacean gastropods. Natural History Museum of Los Angeles County. Science Series 35: i-vi, 1-169 
 Wilson, B. 1993. Australian Marine Shells. Prosobranch Gastropods. Kallaroo, Western Australia : Odyssey Publishing Vol. 1 408 pp

External links
 To World Register of Marine Species

bassianus
Gastropods of Australia
Gastropods described in 1911